Meugliano is a frazione of the comune of Valchiusa in the Metropolitan City of Turin in the Italian region Piedmont, located about  north of Turin. From 1 January 2019, it was merged with Trausella and Vico Canavese to form the new comune.
 
 

Cities and towns in Piedmont
Valchiusa